Nicholas I. Haining (born 1 September 1990) is an Scotland international rugby union player. He plays for Edinburgh Rugby in the United Rugby Championship. Haining's primary positions are number eight and back row.

Rugby Union career

Amateur career

Haining played for Cottesloe rugby club.

Professional career

He started his professional rugby union career in the academy of Western Force. Haining played for Western Force in their game against the 2013 British & Irish Lions.

In May 2014 Haining signed for Jersey in England's RFU Championship, the second tier.

In 2017 he joined Bristol.

In 2019 he signed for Edinburgh.

International career

Haining is Scottish-Qualified, having a grandmother from Dundee.

Haining received his first call up to the senior Scotland squad on 15 January 2020 for the 2020 Six Nations Championship. He was selected to start his first international in the first round of Championship matches, against Ireland in Dublin. He made his debut in the match.

References

1990 births
Living people
Bristol Bears players
Edinburgh Rugby players
Jersey Reds players
Rugby union number eights
Rugby union players from Fremantle
Scotland international rugby union players
Scottish rugby union players
Western Force players